Oro Bay is a bay in Oro Province, Papua New Guinea, located  southeast of Buna. The bay is located within the larger Dyke Ackland Bay.

History

During World War II, Oro Bay was used as staging area, the terminus for convoys of Operation Lilliput, for the battle of Buna-Gona and future operations. A United States advanced base was constructed at Oro Bay, with a liberty ship wharf at the southern end of the bay, installations along the shore, and anti-aircraft gun batteries in the surrounding hills. On 28 March 1943, Imperial Japanese planes attacked shipping and harbour facilities at Oro Bay, resulting in the sinking of SS Masaya and SS Bantam. Oro Bay Airfield was also located near here.

See also
Oro Bay Rural LLG

References

External links
Oro Bay Port

Bays of Papua New Guinea